North Fork Valley Rural Historic District is a national historic district located near Blacksburg, Montgomery County, Virginia.  The district encompasses 125 contributing buildings, 5 contributing sites, and 18 contributing structures. It consists of a significant rural landscape and an important collection of domestic and agricultural buildings, reflecting important agricultural practices in the region from 1745–1940.  It includes domestic and agricultural buildings, a historic archaeological site, as well as an early-20th century school, two late-19th century churches, and five mid- to late-19th century industrial resources including three standing mills, a tanyard site, and a brick kiln site.

It was listed on the National Register of Historic Places in 1991.

References

Historic districts in Montgomery County, Virginia
Greek Revival architecture in Virginia
National Register of Historic Places in Montgomery County, Virginia
Historic districts on the National Register of Historic Places in Virginia